, abbreviated  is the national, four-year university-level service academy aimed to educate and train students who will be serving as officers in the three services of the Japan Self-Defense Forces. It is located in Yokosuka, Kanagawa.

History
In contrast to the pre-war period, when the Imperial Navy and Army had separate academies (Imperial Japanese Army Academy and Imperial Japanese Navy Academy, the National Safety Academy (later the National Defense Academy) was established as a unified institution in order to mitigate the effects of sectionalism and inter-service rivalry. The Academy matriculated its first female student in 1992.

Selection
Its main course students are selected from applicants and typically are recent graduates from Japanese civilian senior high schools who have completed twelve years of formal schooling. They are paid a salary as employees of the Ministry of Defense.

After graduation they are posted to the Officer Candidate Schools in one of three forces, conduct training alongside civilian university graduates and internal promotees before being posted as officers.

Postgraduate
The academy also conducts master's and doctoral level courses for students who are endorsed by their supervisors at their respective serving forces.

Affiliation
The National Institution for Academic Degrees and Quality Enhancement of Higher Education, an Independent Administrative Institution affiliated with the Ministry of Education, Culture, Sports, Science and Technology (MEXT) has recognised the courses and awards the graduates degrees on request. As the Academy is not an MEXT-recognised university, it cannot offer its own degrees.

List of presidents 

Tomoō Maki (August 19, 1952 – January 16, 1965)
Hiroshi Omori (January 16, 1965 – July 1, 1970)
Masamichi Inoki (July 16, 1970 – July 15, 1978)
Kuniyasu Tsuchida (September 29, 1978 – March 24, 1987)
Haruo Natsume (March 24, 1987 – September 30, 1993)
Saburō Matsumoto (October 1, 1993 – March 31, 2000)
Masashi Nishihara (April 1, 2000 – March 31, 2006)
Makoto Iokibe (August 1, 2006 – March 31, 2012)
Ryosei Kokubun (April 1, 2012 – March 31, 2021)
Fumiaki Kubo (April 1, 2021 – present)

Notable alumni 
Yoshifumi Hibako, chief of staff, Japan Ground Self-Defense Force
Yuji Fujinawa, chief of staff, Japan Ground Self-Defense Force
Toshio Tamogami, chief of staff, Japan Air Self-Defense Force
Satoshi Morimoto, scholar
Gen Nakatani, Minister of State for Defense in the first cabinet of Junichiro Koizumi.
Yoshihiro Murai, governor of Miyagi Prefecture
Masahisa Sato, member of the House of Councillors
Takashi Uto, member of the House of Councillors
Kimiya Yui, astronaut

Notable faculty
 Condoleezza Rice had a three-week visiting professorship at the NDAJ in 1984, where she "had a hard time adjusting to the rigid hierarchy," according to her 2010 memoirs, Extraordinary, Ordinary People.
 Ikujiro Nonaka, organizational theorist
 Ikuhiko Hata, historian

See also
 Military academy
 National Defense Medical College
 International Peace Cooperation Activities Training Unit

External links 

National Defense Academy of Japan Webpage

Educational institutions established in 1953
Daigakkō in Japan
Japan Self-Defense Forces
Military academies of Japan
Buildings and structures in Yokosuka, Kanagawa
Universities and colleges in Kanagawa Prefecture
1953 establishments in Japan